Dumbbell Galaxy is a name given to galaxies with a double appearance. Examples are:

 NGC 326
 NGC 1128 in Abell 400
 MRC 0344-291 in Abell 3165
 VV 162
 3C 264

Galaxies